Sudduth is a surname. Notable people with the surname include: 

 Andrew Sudduth (1961–2006), American rower
 Jill Sudduth (born 1971), American synchronised swimmer
 Jimmy Lee Sudduth (1910–2007), American outsider artist and blues musician
 Mikky Ekko (born 1984), stage name of American musician John Stephen Sudduth
 Kohl Sudduth (born 1974), American actor
 Margaret Ashmore Sudduth (1859–1957), American educator, editor, and temperance advocate
 Skipp Sudduth (born 1956), American actor
 Solon B. Sudduth (1908–1963), American football and basketball coach
 Willa Mae Sudduth, co-founder of the Coalition of Labor Union Women

See also
 Sudduth Coliseum, a multi-purpose arena in Lake Charles, Louisiana, US